Fakhr al-Din Mustawfi (died 1290) was a Persian statesman from the Mustawfi family of Qazvin, who lived during the early Ilkhanate era. He was the elder cousin of the distinguished historian and geographer Hamdallah Mustawfi.

According to Hamdallah Mustawfi, Fakhr al-Din Mustawfi enjoyed a flourishing career under the Ilkhanate—first as the ṣāḥib(-i) diwān (finance minister, vizier) of Gaykhatu during his governorship of Anatolia, and then later as bureaucrat under the Ilkhan Arghun Khan. He played a role in the downfall of the Ilkhanate ṣāḥib diwān Shams al-Din Juvayni, being part of the circle of advisors around Arghun, who urged him to make Shams al-Din stand trial, on the accusation of poisoning Arghun's father Abaqa Khan. On 16 October 1284, Shams al-Din was executed, with Fakhr al-Din gaining his previous post of ṣāḥib diwān.

Two years later (1286), however, he was replaced by Jalal al-Din Simnani and sent to govern Anatolia. In the same year, Fakhr al-Din instigated the execution of Shams al-Din's son Sharaf al-Din Harun Juvayni through hateful slander. Fakhr al-Din strengthened Shams al-Din's policy of increasing the Iranian influence in Anatolia, appointing "innumerable Tabrizis, Hamadanis, Iraqis, Khushkanis, Khurasanis, Georgians, Alans, Marandis, Nakhjawanis, Tiflisis and Arranis." This led to a closer connection between Anatolia and the Iranian intellectual and literary world.

Fakhr al-Din Mustawfi eventually fell out and favour and was executed in 1290. The instigator behind this was the new ṣāḥib diwān Sa'ad al-Dawla, who achieved this through the spread of defamation. This earned him the animosity of the Mustawfi family.

References

Sources 
 
  
  
 
 

Viziers of the Ilkhanate
Year of birth unknown
1290 deaths
People from Qazvin
13th-century Iranian people
Officials of the Ilkhanate
People executed by the Mongol Empire